Wyrzyki may refer to the following places:
Wyrzyki, Łosice County in Masovian Voivodeship (east-central Poland)
Wyrzyki, Pułtusk County in Masovian Voivodeship (east-central Poland)
Wyrzyki, Podlaskie Voivodeship (north-east Poland)